Bizonula is a genus of flowering plants belonging to the family Sapindaceae.

Its native range is Western Central Tropical Africa.

Species:

Bizonula letestui

References

Sapindaceae
Sapindaceae genera